Mohammed Namadi Sambo  (born 2 August 1954) is a Nigerian politician who was Vice President of Nigeria from 19 May 2010 to 29 May 2015. He previously served as Governor of Kaduna State from 2007 to 2010.

Early life
Namadi was born on 2 August 1954 in Zaria, Kaduna State, Nigeria. He attended Baptist Primary School in Kakuri, Kaduna, before attending Kobi Primary School in Bauchi and Towns School No. 1 in Zaria. From 1967 until 1971, he attended Government Secondary School (now Alhuda-Huda College), in Zaria.

Education 
Namadi attended the School of Basic Studies at Ahmadu Bello University in Zaria in 1972, after which he joined its Department of Architecture, graduating in 1976 with a bachelors degree with honours (BSc (Hons)). He also holds a master's degree in architecture.

Early career 
Sambo served with the Oyo State Ministry of Works and Housing for the National Youth Service Corps up to August 1979. He then went into private practice as an architect.  In 1988, he was appointed Commissioner for Works, Transport and Housing in Kaduna. In 1990, Sambo left the service of the Kaduna State Government and went back to private practice.

Governor of Kaduna State
In May 2007, Namadi assumed office as Governor of Kaduna State. His term ended on 18 May 2010. Sambo had an 11-point agenda as Governor of Kaduna State that was to focus on empowering the youth and women of the community and to address security for the state. While still serving as governor, he was picked by the then president of Nigeria, Goodluck Jonathan, to become the Vice President.

Vice President of Nigeria

Following the death of President Umaru Yar'Adua, Goodluck Jonathan was sworn in as the President. and nominated Sambo as Vice President. His official correspondence conveying the nomination of Sambo for the VP position was received by the National Assembly on 15 May 2010. On 18 May 2010, the National Assembly approved the nomination. On 19 May 2010, Namadi Sambo was formally sworn in as the Vice-President of Nigeria, serving in office until 29 May 2015.

See also
List of Governors of Kaduna State
Vice President of Nigeria

References

External links
Arewaonline website
 https://web.archive.org/web/20141218042013/http://nigeriatownhall.com/
 https://web.archive.org/web/20140714125345/http://www.arcnamadisambo.com/
Index of speeches by Gov. Sambo from the Kaduna State website

|-

|-

|-

1954 births
Vice presidents of Nigeria
Governors of Kaduna State
Peoples Democratic Party state governors of Nigeria
Nigerian Muslims
Ahmadu Bello University alumni
Living people
People from Zaria
Candidates in the 2015 Nigerian general election
Candidates in the Nigerian general election, 2011
Peoples Democratic Party vice presidents of Nigeria
20th-century Nigerian architects
21st-century Nigerian architects